New North Road is a street in the central and western Auckland isthmus, New Zealand, connecting Upper Symonds Street in Eden Terrace to Avondale. The road runs parallel to Great North Road, located to the north, and crosses Dominion Road, the Western Line at Morningside and runs above the Waterview Tunnel section of the Southwestern Motorway at Mount Albert.

History

The modern road began life as a rough track in the 1850s, known as the Whau Road. In December 1853, a survey was commissioned to build the route, however by January 1854 the proposed route was scrapped, due to opponents of the scheme highlighting that the allocated funds for the programme could only be spent on road construction, when land also needed to be purchased from early Mount Albert landowners Allan Kerr Taylor and George Bray. By 1855, Auckland settlers petitioned the Auckland Provincial Council for funding, as many properties had no road access, limiting growth in the area.

In May 1864, a meeting was held at Whau School (modern Avondale Primary School) to discuss the creation of a new Great North Road (then the major route west from Auckland township), to address the issues caused by a lack of roading. By September 1864, the treasurer of the Auckland Province announced that the Whau Road Extension was surveyed, and due for construction. In 1865, allotments for the new village of Morningside were sold.

In October 1866, the Mt Albert District Highway Board was formed, to collect rates to administer and develop New North Road. Tensions formed between two groups of ratepayers in the highway district: the city-side ratepayers at Eden Terrace, and the mountain-side ratepayers in the rural west, with the former believing that they paid too high rates for a road that "led nowhere". In June 1875, the Eden Terrace Highway Board was formed, splitting the city-side area of the road from the rural.

The New North Road corridor grew as a suburban area between the 1900s and the 1930s, due to the Auckland tramlines. The tramline opened at Kingsland in 1903, followed by Morningside in 1912, Mount Albert in 1915 and eventually Owairaka in 1936.

Notable locations
The Sri Radha Krishna Mandir Temple and the adjacent Mahatma Gandhi Centre in Eden Terrace, major centres for the Indian and Hindu communities of Auckland.
Kingsland town centre, including the Kingsland railway station
Morningside town cetnre, including the Morningside railway station
St Luke's Church, a historic Anglican church
Mount Albert War Memorial Reserve, which includes Rocket Park and the Mount Albert War Memorial Hall
Alice Wylie Reserve
Ferndale, a historic residence in Mount Albert
Mount Albert town centre, including the Mount Albert railway station

Gallery

References

Streets in Auckland